Veruzhka Tatiana Ramírez (born July 30, 1979) is a Venezuelan beauty pageant titleholder who was Miss Venezuela 1997 and winner of the Best in Swimsuit award and first runner-up to Miss Universe 1998.

Miss Venezuela 1997
Ramirez was abandoned as a child and grew up in relative poverty. In 1997, reigning Miss Venezuela Marena Bencomo visited Táchira, where Ramírez approached her for an autograph. Bencomo encouraged her to go to Caracas to compete for the Miss Venezuela 1997 title, where Osmel Sousa appointed her as Miss Táchira.
 
During the Miss Venezuela 1997 pageant, Ramírez captured the crown and the right to represent her country in Miss Universe 1998.

Miss Universe 1998
Ramírez was the official representative of Venezuela to Miss Universe 1998, held in Honolulu, Hawaii. She placed first runner-up to Wendy Fitzwilliam of Trinidad and Tobago.

Kidnapping
Ramírez was kidnapped for three hours in 2003.

See also
List of kidnappings
List of solved missing person cases

References

External links
Miss Venezuela Official Website

1979 births
2000s missing person cases
2003 crimes in Venezuela
Formerly missing people
Kidnapped Venezuelan people
Living people
Missing person cases in Venezuela
Miss Universe 1998 contestants
Miss Venezuela winners
People from Táchira
Venezuelan female models